PD-137889 (N-methylhexahydrofluorenamine) is a chemical compound that is active as an NMDA receptor antagonist in the central nervous system at roughly 30 times the potency of the "flagship" of its class, ketamine, and substitutes for phencyclidine in animal studies. Ki [3H]TCP binding = 27 nM versus ketamine's Ki = 860 nM.

See also
Aptiganel
Dizocilpine
Fourphit
Metaphit
Selfotel

References

Arylcyclohexylamines
Dissociative drugs
General anesthetics
NMDA receptor antagonists
Sedatives
Tricyclic compounds